Lesley Ann Warren (born August 16, 1946) is an American actress and singer. 

She made her Broadway debut in 1963, aged 17, in 110 in the Shade. In 1965 she received wide recognition for playing the title role in the television musical production of Cinderella. She later had starring roles in the Disney musical films The Happiest Millionaire (1967) and The One and Only, Genuine, Original Family Band (1968), both co-starred opposite John Davidson.

In the 1970s, Warren worked mostly on television, receiving a Golden Globe nomination for playing Dana Lambert in the CBS drama series Mission: Impossible (1970–71). In 1977, she won a Golden Globe for Best Actress in a Drama Series for the NBC miniseries Harold Robbins' 79 Park Avenue. In 1983, Warren was nominated for an Academy Award for Best Supporting Actress for playing Norma Cassidy in Victor/Victoria. She received two additional Golden Globe nominations for performances in Songwriter (1984) and Family of Spies (1990). 

Her other film appearances include Race for the Yankee Zephyr (1981), A Night in Heaven (1983), Choose Me (1984), Clue (1985), Burglar (1987), Cop (1988), Life Stinks (1991), Pure Country (1992), Color of Night (1994), The Limey (1999), and Secretary (2002).

Early life
Warren was born in New York City, the daughter of Margot (née Verblow), a British-born singer, and William Warren, a real estate agent. She has a brother, Richard Lewis Warren.

She attended the Professional Children's School at the age of six and The High School of Music & Art at the age of 13.

Career

1960s and 1970s

In 1961, Warren began training as a ballet dancer at the School of American Ballet at the age of 14. Her career began in 1962 at age 15 when she made a tape of herself singing the Queen of the Night aria from The Magic Flute (the first and only time she sang opera). She entered the Actors Studio at the age of 17 — reputedly the youngest applicant ever to be accepted. Her Broadway debut came in 1963 in the musical 110 in the Shade. She won the Theatre World Award for her performance in the 1965 flop musical Drat! The Cat! In 1973, she portrayed Scarlett O'Hara in the Los Angeles production of the musical Scarlett; however, the play was poorly reviewed and did not continue to Broadway as planned.

Warren achieved her first major television success in the title role of Rodgers and Hammerstein's Cinderella in 1965. She appeared in such TV shows as Dr. Kildare, Gunsmoke, The Mod Squad, Love, American Style, Columbo, and The Carol Burnett Show. 

Her film debut was in the 1967 musical comedy The Happiest Millionaire, the last movie Walt Disney worked on before his death. The following year, she went to star opposite Walter Brennan in the musical film The One and Only, Genuine, Original Family Band. This year, she placed at No. 15 on the Laurel Awards list for Female New Face. 

During the 1970s, Warren appeared in only two feature films: Pickup on 101 (1972) and Harry and Walter Go to New York (1976). Meanwhile, Warren worked regularly on television. She played the role of Dana Lambert, the leading woman on the CBS action drama Mission: Impossible, during the 1970–71 season. According to The Complete Mission: Impossible Dossier by Patrick White, she was inexperienced for the part and left after only one year. For her performance, she received a Golden Globe Award nomination for Best Supporting Actress. 

Throughout the 1970s, Warren was a leading lady of TV movies and miniseries. Her notable credits include The Daughters of Joshua Cabe (1972), The Letters (1973), The Legend of Valentino (1975), Betrayal (1978), and Pearl (1978). She appeared as a guest star in the third season of The Muppet Show. In 1975, Warren played a fatefully and fatally gullible psychiatric patient opposite Peter Falk and George Hamilton in the Columbo episode "A Deadly State of Mind". Warren also played Lois Lane in the 1975 TV special It's a Bird...It's a Plane...It's Superman, adapted from the Broadway musical of the same name. Warren went on to screen test for the role of Lois Lane in the 1978 Superman film, a role given to Margot Kidder (footage of Warren's screen test is included as a supplementary feature on VHS and DVD releases of the film). In 1978, she won the Golden Globe Award for Best Actress – Television Series Drama for the NBC miniseries Harold Robbins' 79 Park Avenue.

1980s and 1990s
In 1981, Warren returned to the big screen starring alongside Ken Wahl, George Peppard, and Donald Pleasence in Race for the Yankee Zephyr, a New Zealand suspense-action-thriller film directed by David Hemmings. The following year, she played a gangster's ditzy moll Norma Cassidy in Blake Edwards' musical comedy Victor/Victoria. Warren was nominated for a Golden Globe and Academy Award for Best Supporting Actress. She went to star in the 1983 romantic drama A Night in Heaven with Christopher Atkins; critics widely panned the film. Warren received another Golden Globe Award nomination for Best Supporting Actress for starring opposite Willie Nelson and Kris Kristofferson in the 1984 musical comedy film Songwriter. That same year, she had a leading role in the love triangle drama Choose Me with Keith Carradine and Genevieve Bujold. She turned down a chance to audition for the Kathleen Turner role in Romancing the Stone. In 1985, she starred as one of the prime murder suspects, Miss Scarlet, in the comedy film version of the popular board game Clue.

Warren played supporting roles in a number of movies, including Burglar (1987) with Whoopi Goldberg, Cop (1988) with James Woods, Worth Winning (1989) with Mark Harmon, Life Stinks (1991) with Mel Brooks and Pure Country (1992) with George Strait. In Color of Night (1994) Warren played a nymphomaniac; the film was poorly received, and she was nominated for a Golden Raspberry Award for Worst Supporting Actress. However, it was successful on the home video market. On television, she went to star in Beulah Land (1980), Portrait of a Showgirl (1982), Evergreen (1985) and Baja Oklahoma (1988). She received Primetime Emmy Award for Outstanding Lead Actress in a Limited Series or Movie and Golden Globe Award for Best Actress – Miniseries or Television Film nominations for Family of Spies in 1990. Warren also played Princess Jeanetta in the 1987 Faerie Tale Theatre episode The Dancing Princesses, an adaptation of the fairy tale The Twelve Dancing Princesses. In 1986, Lesley was prominently featured in Bob Seger's popular music video for his hit song "American Storm." In 1989, she appeared in the Aerosmith video "Janie's Got a Gun", wherein she played Janie's mother. She was also featured in a video for the Eagles' "Life in the Fast Lane". In 1995, she co-starred opposite Ben Kingsley in the television film Joseph. She had a major role in Steven Soderbergh's The Limey (1999), starring Terence Stamp.

2000s and 2010s

In 2000s, Warren appeared in a number of independent films, most notably the 2002 comedy-drama Secretary, playing the mother of the title character. She had recurring roles on the NBC sitcom Will & Grace from 2001 to 2006 as Will Truman's father's mistress and in 2005 in the ABC comedy-drama Desperate Housewives as Susan Mayer's mother. Other television credits included Touched by an Angel, The Practice, Crossing Jordan and Less than Perfect. From 2008 to 2012, Warren played the role of Jinx Shannon, the lead character's alcoholic mother in the USA Network drama series In Plain Sight. While working on that show, Warren was offered Mary Steenburgen's role in Step Brothers (2008) but had to turn it down because of scheduling conflicts.

Warren appeared in the films Peep World (2010), Jobs (2013), I Am Michael (2015) and 3 Days with Dad (2019). In 2013, she reunited with Clue castmates Christopher Lloyd and Martin Mull when they guest-starred in an episode of Psych, and again with Martin Mull in 2015 guest-starring on Community. In 2016, she had a recurring role in the Starz comedy Blunt Talk and in 2018 appeared in the Netflix superhero series Daredevil as Esther Falb. In 2019, she co-starred in the short-lived Lifetime comedy-drama series American Princess, and appeared opposite Sarah Drew in the Lifetime Christmas movie Twinkle All the Way.

2020s
In 2021, Warren guest-starred in an episode of the legal series All Rise on CBS. In 2022, she appeared as a regular cast member of the eight-part streaming television series Panhandle.

Personal life
Warren married producer Jon Peters in 1967 and divorced him in 1975 after a two-year separation. They have one son, Christopher Peters.

From 1977 to 1985, she lived with choreographer Jeffrey Hornaday. She also briefly dated producer Robert Evans, saxophonist David Sanborn, singers Bobby Darin and Paul Stanley, and actors Scott Baio, Robert Blake, Val Kilmer and John Strasberg.

Since 2000, Warren has been married to ad executive Ron Taft, whom she met at a hair salon in 1991.

Filmography

Film

Television

References

External links

 
 
 
 

1946 births
Living people
Actresses from New York City
American women singers
American film actresses
American musical theatre actresses
American stage actresses
American television actresses
Best Drama Actress Golden Globe (television) winners
The High School of Music & Art alumni
People from New York City
20th-century American actresses
21st-century American actresses